Brest District is an administrative subdivision, a raion of Brest Region, in Belarus.
Its administrative center is Brest.

Demographics
At the time of the Belarus Census (2009), Brest District had a population of 39,426. Of these, 83.0% were of Belarusian, 8.1% Russian, 6.9% Ukrainian and 0.9% Polish ethnicity. 54.8% spoke Russian and 40.4% Belarusian as their native language.

Industries
This raion is specialized in agriculture. Several recreational areas like Belaye Vozera, summer camps and rest homes along the Mukhavets River attract numerous tourists from the country and abroad.

External links 

 Photos on Radzima.org

 
Districts of Brest Region